Siah Darreh (also Romanized as Sīāh Darreh) is a village in Tariq ol Eslam Rural District, in the Central District of Nahavand County, Hamadan Province, Iran. At the 2006 census, its population was 260, in 56 families.

References 

Populated places in Nahavand County